Milka Chepkorir (born 1990) is an anthropologist, climate and human right activist. Her activism was further known when she became representative for Sengwer People who lives around Embobut and Kapolet Forest to defend their right after being forcefully evicted by Kenya Forest Service (KFS).

Background and education 
Chepkorir belong to Sengwer People from Kapolet Forest. She lives in Kitale, Kenya. She got Bachelor of Anthropology degree from Maseno University. Currently, she is studying a Masters in Gender and Development Studies at the University of Nairobi under JHW initiative's grant.

Activism 
Her activism started when she was still in high school. Thought, her activism was further known when she became one of fellow for UN Human Rights Office Indigenous Fellowship Programme in 2016.

Through this fellowship, she attend 16th United Nation Permanent Forum on Indigenous Issues in New York and report lack of implementation on Indigenous right by UN by representing Forest Peoples Programme, Natural Justice and 20 other organisations. She also shares the infringement of KFS where they burn 90 homes of Sengwer people which started when European Union and World bank funding them.

She returned on 17th United Nation Permanent Forum on Indigenous Issues on 2018 and report the mistreatment of Kenyan Forest Service by forcefully evicting Sengwer People from their ancestral land. Sengwer people has face a coupled of eviction caused of Water Towers Protection and Climate Change Mitigation and Adaptation Programme funded by European Union. This forced eviction was done by KFS and from Chepkorir's statement:"They took a six-year-old boy and went around burning houses with him after his mother fled. They left him in the forest at night alone"Following this report, EU suspended the project.

Career 
Currently, she works as Coordinator of Community Land Action NOW! (CLAN), Coordinator for Defending Territories of Life and also advisor for Agroecology fund.

References 

Living people
1990 births
Indigenous rights activists
Youth climate activists
Kenyan women environmentalists
People from Kitale
Maseno University alumni